Abdesslem Dekkiche (born 27 February 1986) is an Algerian basketball player who plays for GS Pétroliers. He also played for the Algeria national basketball team during his career.

National team career
Dekkiche played with the Algeria national basketball team at the 2013, 2015 and 2017 AfroBasket tournaments.

Honours

Club
GS Pétroliers
Super Division: 2012, 2014, 2015, 2016, 2017, 2018, 2019
Algerian Basketball Cup: 2012, 2013, 2014, 2015, 2016

BAL career statistics

Retrieved from RealGM.com.

|-
| style="text-align:left;"|2021
| style="text-align:left;"|GS Pétroliers
| 3 || 2 || 25.5 || .364 || .000 || .286 || 3.0 || 3.0 || 1.7 || .3 || 3.3
|-
|- class="sortbottom"
| style="text-align:center;" colspan="2"|Career
| 3 || 2 || 25.5 || .364 || .000 || .286 || 3.0 || 3.0 || 1.7 || .3 || 3.3

References

External links
 Profile basketball.afrobasket

1986 births
Living people
Algerian men's basketball players
People from Boufarik
GS Pétroliers basketball players
Power forwards (basketball)
21st-century Algerian people